Worthenella is a genus of enigmatic arthropod from the Burgess Shale. It known from a single specimen described initially as an annelid by Charles Doolittle Walcott in 1911. The body is elongate and myriapod-like with a head and at least 46 body segments. The head bares poorly preserved appendages, while filamentous branched structures appear to run along the underside of the first 34 trunk segments, with the posterior 8 suggested to bare longer appendages. In 2013, David Legg placed it in the family Kootenichelidae as a sister to Kootenichela , based on the supposed presence of antenniform head appendages. However, this position was questioned in a later study, which argued that the supposed annteniform appendages were actually taphonomic artefacts.

References

Megacheira
Prehistoric arthropod genera
Burgess Shale fossils
Cambrian genus extinctions